Monkey bread (also known by other names including plucking cake, pull-apart bread, and bubble bread) is a soft, sweet, sticky pastry served in the United States for breakfast or as a treat. It consists of pieces of soft baked dough sprinkled with cinnamon. It is often served at fairs and festivals.

Name

The origin of the term "monkey bread" comes from the pastry being a finger food; the consumer would pick apart the bread as a monkey would.

Origins
What most people know as monkey bread today in the United States is actually the Hungarian dessert arany galuska ("golden dumpling"). Dating back to the 1880s in Hungarian literature, Hungarian immigrants brought this dish with them when they immigrated to America and began introducing it into the country's food landscape when Hungarian and Hungarian Jewish bakeries began selling it in the mid-twentieth century.

In 1972, a cookbook published by Betty Crocker included a recipe for arany galuska, which they referred to as "Hungarian Coffee Cake". As it became more popular in America, arany galuska came to be confused with monkey bread in which the balls of dough are not dipped in cinnamon and sugar but only in butter. "Monkey bread" soon became the more common name for this Hungarian Jewish dessert.

Recipes for the bread first appeared in American women's magazines and community cookbooks in the 1950s. During the 1980s, Nancy Reagan popularized serving monkey bread during Christmas by making it a staple of the Reagan White House Christmas.

Preparation
The bread is made with pieces of sweet yeast dough (often frozen), which are baked in a cake pan at high heat after first being individually covered in melted butter, cinnamon, and sugar. Chopped pecans are also commonly added.  It is traditionally served hot so that the baked segments can be easily torn away with the fingers and eaten by hand.

See also

 List of buns
 List of pastries

References

Food and drink introduced in the 19th century
Breads
Pastries